Śmietana is a surname. Notable people with the surname include:

 Alicja Smietana (born 1983). Polish violinist, viola player, arranger, and composer
 Jarek Śmietana (1951–2013), Polish jazz musician, father of Alicja

See also
 Smetana (dairy product)